Antonieta Zevallos de Prialé (1918/1919 – 8 August 2006) was a Peruvian politician who served in the Chamber of Deputies from 1980 until 1985, representing Lima as a member of the Peruvian Aprista Party. Her husband Ramiro Prialé was the leader of the Peruvian Aprista Party.

Biography 
Antonieta Zevallos de Prialé was born in 1918 or 1919. In 1945, she met Ramiro Prialé, the leader of the Peruvian Aprista Party, and the couple married later that year. Zevallos served as a key advisor to her husband, and founded the women's wing of the party. In the 1980 Peruvian general election, Zevallos was elected to the Chamber of Deputies, representing Lima as a member of the Peruvian Aprista Party. She left office at the end of her term in 1985. During her life, Zevallos also led several social organizations, including the Foundation of the Children of the Town and the National Comprehensive Program for Family Well-being (INABIF).

Zevallos died on 8 August 2006 at the age of 87. Her coffin was taken to the Legislative Palace, where Peruvian Aprista Party congressmembers Mauricio Mulder and Mercedes Cabanillas paid tribute to her.

References

Citations

Works cited 

1910s births
2006 deaths
Year of birth uncertain
Date of birth unknown
Place of birth unknown
Place of death missing
20th-century Peruvian politicians
20th-century Peruvian women politicians
American Popular Revolutionary Alliance politicians
Politicians from Lima
Members of the Chamber of Deputies of Peru